Saundra Mitchell (born September 3, 1973) is an American novelist who has also written under the pseudonyms of Jessa Holbrook and Alex Mallory.

Personal life 
Mitchell is gay and has daughters.

Career 
Mitchell worked as the head screenwriter and executive producer with Dreaming Tree Films for twenty years. Using her screenplays, the company produced more than 400 films. She has Academy Award eligibility ten times.

Selected accolades

Publications

Fiction

Standalone novels 

 Shadowed Summer (2009)
 Breathkept (2011)
 Defy the Dark (2013)
 While You're Away, as Jessa Holbrook (2013)
 Wild, as Alex Mallory (2014)
 Mistwalker (2014)
 All the Things We Do in the Dark (2019)
 The Prom: A Novel Based on the Hit Broadway Musical, with Chad Beguelin, Bob Martin, and Matthew Sklar (2019)

The Vespertine series 

 The Vespertine (2011)
 The Springsweet (2012)
 The Elementals (2013)

Camp Murderface series 

 Camp Murderface, with Josh Berk (2020)
 Doom in the Deep, with Josh Berk (2021)

Nonfiction 

 50 Unbelievable Women and Their Fascinating (and True!) Stories (2016)
 50 Impressive Kids and Their Amazing (and True!) Stories (2016)

Short stories 

 "" in Lightspeed Magazine (September 2014)

Anthologies 

 Love And Sacrifice: Touching Stories About Troubled Relationships (2007)
 Truth and Dare: 20 Tales of Heartbreak and Happiness (2011)
 The First Time (2011)
 Grim (2014)
 A Tyranny of Petticoats (2016)
 All Out: The No-Longer-Secret Stories of Queer Teens throughout the Ages (2018)
 Foreshadow: A Serial YA Anthology of Short Stories (2019)
 You Too?: 25 Voices Share Their #MeToo Stories (2020)
 Out Now: Queer We Go Again! (2020)
 Out There: Into the Queer New Yonder (2022)
 Transmogrify! (2023)

Filmography

Films 

 Alternate Universe: A Rescue Mission (2016)

Shorts 

 Operation Daylight (2004) 
 Requiem (2004) 
 Going Down to Neverland (2004) 
 World of Weird (2004) 
 The War (2004)

 Warehouse (2005) 
 Last Time We Met (2005) 
 Moments of Grace (2005) 
 The Otis Revue (2005) 
 Curtain Call (2005) 
 Goodbye, Howard (2005) 
 Bargain Basement (2005) 
 TTYL (2005) 
 Given This Day (2005) 
 Wash (2005)
 Ringing of the Belles (2010)
 K-Run FM (2010) 
 Justice (2011)

TV Series 

 Gwen's World of Weird (2017)

References

External links 

 Official website

Living people
1973 births
American LGBT writers